Crazy World is the eleventh studio album by the German hard rock band Scorpions, released on 6 November 1990. The album peaked at No. 21 on the Billboard 200 chart for albums in 1991. That same year, the song "Wind of Change" reached No. 4 on the Billboard Hot 100 and "Send Me an Angel" reached No. 44 on the same chart. It also has the only Scorpions track to credit bassist Francis Buchholz as a writer, "Kicks After Six". This album was the band's first album in a decade and a half to not be produced by Dieter Dierks.

Crazy World became the band's only album to reach number one in their home country of Germany. In the UK, it remains the only Scorpions album to attain Silver certification (60,000 units sold) by the British Phonographic Industry, achieving this in November 1991. In the United States, it is the band's second best-selling album to 1984's Love at First Sting, and their last one to be certified at least gold by the RIAA. It was the band's last studio album to feature the Lovedrive-era lineup, with Buchholz leaving the band in January 1992.

"Hit Between the Eyes" was played during the ending credits of the 1992 film Freejack.

"Send Me an Angel" was played at the closing scene in the 2004 Cold Case episode "Who's Your Daddy." 
"Wind of Change" was also used during the 2009 film Gentlemen Broncos and towards the end of the 2014 film The Interview and international version soundtrack featured Nutri Ventures in pilot episode.

Reception
Adrien Begrand writing for PopMatters called the album "pop metal by [the] numbers".

Track listing

Personnel

Scorpions
 Klaus Meine – lead vocals, additional "gang" vocals on "Tease Me Please Me", additional "bang" vocals on "Crazy World"
 Rudolf Schenker – rhythm guitar, backing vocals, lead guitar on "Wind of Change" and "Send Me an Angel", additional "gang" vocals on "Tease Me Please Me", additional "bang" vocals on "Crazy World"
 Matthias Jabs – lead guitar, backing vocals, rhythm guitar on "Wind of Change" and "Send Me an Angel", additional "gang" vocals on "Tease Me Please Me", additional "bang" vocals on "Crazy World"
 Francis Buchholz – bass, backing vocals
 Herman Rarebell – drums, backing vocals

Additional musicians
Koen van Baal – keyboards on "Wind of Change"
Jim Vallance – keyboards on "Send Me an Angel"
Roy Tesse, Dries van der Schuyt, Ria Makker, Gerard v.d. Pot, Louis Spillman, Wolfgang Praetz, Inka Esser, Claudia Frohling, Cliff Roles, Peter Angmeer, Tony Ioannoua and Jim Lewis – "gang" vocals on "Tease Me Please Me"
Marcel Gelderblom, Mirjam Erftemeijer, Henk Horden and Patrick Ulenberg - "bang" vocals on "Crazy World"

Production
Keith Olsen – producer, engineer, mixing, additional "gang" vocals on "Tease Me Please Me", additional "bang" vocals on "Crazy World"
Erwin Musper – engineer, mixing, additional "gang" vocals on "Tease Me Please Me", additional "bang" vocals on "Crazy World"
Shay Baby – additional engineering, mixing
Attie Bauw, Albert Boekholt, Tom Fletcher – assistant engineers
Greg Fulginiti – mastering

Charts

Album

Singles

Certifications

References 

1990 albums
Scorpions (band) albums
Albums produced by Keith Olsen
Mercury Records albums
Vertigo Records albums
Albums with cover art by Storm Thorgerson
Glam metal albums